Erwin Haas (born 20 July 1945) is a German rower. He competed in the men's coxless pair event at the 1972 Summer Olympics.

References

External links
 

1945 births
Living people
German male rowers
Olympic rowers of West Germany
Rowers at the 1972 Summer Olympics
Sportspeople from Offenbach am Main